Leybourne is a small village and civil parish in Kent, England.

Leybourne may also refer to:

 Leybourne Islands, Nunavut, Canada
 Roger de Leybourne (1215–1271), Lord Warden of the Cinque Ports and Sheriff of Kent
 George Leybourne (1842–1884), English music hall performer
 William Leybourn (1626—1716), English surveyor and mathematician

See also
 
 Leyburn
 Legbourne